Estadio Fiscal de Linares is a multi-use public stadium in Linares, Chile.  It is currently used mostly for football matches and is the home stadium of Linares Unido. The stadium holds 7,000 people and was built in 1948.

References

Fiscal de Linares
Sports venues in Maule Region